An independent baseball league is a professional baseball organization in the United States or Canada that is not overseen by Major League Baseball and is outside the Minor League Baseball clubs affiliated to it.

The Northern League and Frontier League both started play in 1993, and the Northern League's success paved the way for other independent leagues like the Texas-Louisiana League and Northeast League. The Atlantic League has had more marquee players than any other independent league, including Jose Canseco, Mat Latos, Steve Lombardozzi Jr., Francisco Rodríguez, Chien-Ming Wang, Roger Clemens, Rich Hill, Scott Kazmir, Juan González, John Rocker, and Dontrelle Willis. Two former Atlantic League players are in the National Baseball Hall of Fame and Museum, Tim Raines and Rickey Henderson. Gary Carter, another Hall of Famer, managed in the league. The Atlantic League has had many notable managers and coaches, including Wally Backman, Frank Viola, Tommy John, Sparky Lyle, and Bud Harrelson. The Northern League alumni include Leon "Bull" Durham, J. D. Drew, and Darryl Strawberry.

Independent leagues have flourished in northeastern states, where dense populations can often support multiple franchises. Because they are not subject to the territorial limitations imposed on affiliated minor-league teams, independent clubs can relocate as close to affiliated teams (and one another) as they choose to.  For example, the city of Lancaster, Pennsylvania, cannot have an affiliated team because of its proximity to the Harrisburg Senators and Reading Fightin Phils, leaving the Atlantic League to place a team—the Lancaster Barnstormers—to fill the void.  Another example is the greater New York City metropolitan area, where there are many independent teams: the Long Island Ducks, Staten Island FerryHawks, New Jersey Jackals, New York Boulders, and Sussex County Miners.

Current leagues 

Map of independent league teams

Defunct leagues

See also
List of professional baseball leagues
List of baseball teams in Canada (including leagues)

References

External links
 IndependentBaseball.net

 
Baseball genres